Tiszagyenda is a village in Jász-Nagykun-Szolnok county, in the Northern Great Plain region of central Hungary.

Etymology
Tiszagyans is first mentioned in 1302 as Qyanda. According to Lajos Kiss, it probably comes from Turkic *Vandi "the one who returned", and may have been a personal name.

Geography

External links
 Official site in Hungarian
http://www.maplandia.com/hungary/jasz-nagykun-szolnok/tiszagyenda/

Populated places in Jász-Nagykun-Szolnok County